The COVID-19 pandemic in Turkey is part of the ongoing pandemic of coronavirus disease 2019 caused by severe acute respiratory syndrome coronavirus 2.

The first case in Turkey was recorded on 11 March, when a local returned home from a trip to Europe. The first death due to COVID-19 in the country occurred on 15 March. Turkey stood out from the rest of Europe by not ordering a legal lockdown until April 2021, when the country enacted its first nationwide restrictions. The government kept many businesses open, and allowed companies to set their own guidelines regarding workers.

The Turkish health system has the highest number of intensive care units in the world at 46.5 beds per 100,000 people (compared to 9.6 in Greece, 11.6 in France, and 12.6 in Italy). , Turkey's observed case-fatality rate stands at 0.84%, the 148th highest rate globally. This low case-fatality rate has generated various explanations including the relative rarity of nursing homes, favorable demographics, long legacy of contact tracing, high number of intensive care units, universal health care, and a lockdown regime that led to a higher proportion of positive cases among working-age adults. However, according to an August 2020 academic study by The International Journal of Health Planning and Management, the government of Turkey has been underreporting COVID-19 statistics.

On 30 September 2020, Turkish Minister of Health Fahrettin Koca acknowledged that since 29 July, the reported number of cases was limited to symptomatic cases that required monitoring, which was met with rebuke by the Turkish Medical Association. This practice ended on 25 November, when the ministry started to report asymptomatic and mildly symptomatic cases alongside symptomatic ones.

Background 
On 12 January 2020, the World Health Organization (WHO) confirmed that a novel coronavirus was the cause of a respiratory illness in a cluster of people in Wuhan City, Hubei Province, China, which was reported to the WHO on 31 December 2019.

The case fatality ratio for COVID-19 has been much lower than SARS of 2003, but the transmission has been significantly greater, with a significant total death toll.

Timeline

January 2020 

On 10 January 2020, ignoring China's insistence on the lack of evidence for human-to-human transmission, Ministry of Health experts stated that they suspected that SARS-CoV-2 was transmitted among people, and accordingly set up the Coronavirus Scientific Advisory Board. 26 experts in infectious diseases and clinical microbiology originally comprised the Coronavirus Advisory Board, which was subsequently enlarged to include five additional experts in intensive care medicine, internal medicine, and virology. The board put forward voluntary recommendations while the government issued legal restrictions for businesses and public gatherings.

On 24 January, Turkey's health ministry installed medical stations nationwide to measure the body temperature of passersby and set up free hand sanitizer stations across public transportation hubs.

February 2020 

On 1 February, Turkey announced its decision to stop all the flights from China. After Iranian authorities downplayed the spread of SARS‑CoV‑2, Turkey castigated Iran for its duplicity and laxity and unilaterally closed its border on 23 February. On the same day, Turkey announced its decision to stop all flights to and from Iran.

On 29 February, Turkey announced the termination of all flights to and from Italy, South Korea and Iraq.

March 2020: First confirmed case, closures, and cancellations 

Turkish cities carried out massive disinfection work in public places and mass transit vehicles. In Istanbul, the municipality decided to install hand sanitizers at stations of metrobuses.

On 11 March 2020, the very day the first known coronavirus case in Turkey was announced, Ministry of Health created a new website to track cases of COVID-19, monitor hot spots, enable people to report places selling fake PPE, and report hospital wait times.

The next day, Ministry of National Education announced that with the exception of schools catering to students with special needs, all schools in Turkey would close starting on 16 March 2020. Given the intense learning needs of students with disabilities, the Ministry of National Education announced that elementary-, middle- and high-school students with special needs will continue to have in-person attendance in fixed small groups, with adults rotating into the class, so as to facilitate contact tracing. The Ministry of National Education subsequently announced that teachers and staff in schools for students with special needs are able to opt out of in-person teaching if they or their families have a health risk.

Minister Koca updated the number of infected people as four on 13 March, including a pilgrim who had returned from Saudi Arabia. Following the updated tally, Turkey extended the flight ban to also include many European countries, including Austria, France, and Germany.

On 16 March, Minister of the Interior Soylu ordered businesses and places of worship to halt indoor activities. With that announcement, more than 80 million people in Turkey started to live under some form of restrictions to their movements when trains and public transit came to a halt nationwide.

On 20 March, Ministry of Health issued a decree that designates as "pandemic hospitals" all hospitals that employ at least two specialist doctors in the areas of infectious diseases and clinical microbiology, pulmonology, and internal diseases, and have level-3 adult ICU beds. At the same time, Turkey started to open drive-through screening clinics, based on the South Korean-pioneered model, which allows the provision of tests at no cost, while avoiding nosocomial transmission of SARS-CoV-2.

On 21 March, the Minister of the Interior Soylu announced a total curfew, effective midnight on 22 March, for those who are over the age of 65 or persons whose immune system is compromised due to "chronic pulmonary diseases, asthma, COPD, cardiovascular disease, kidney disease, hypertension, and liver disease."

On 23 March, Minister of Health Koca announced that the Ministry of Health authorized the Japanese anti-flu drug Favipiravir for emergency use, after early data disclosed by China's Science and Technology Minister Wang Zhigang showed that the drug shortens recovery time for COVID-19 patients.

On 31 March, following consultations with trade unions spearheaded by TÜRK-İŞ and DİSK, the government launched a paycheck protection program that helped small businesses to keep employees on their books.
 Trade unions criticized this plan for not directly subsidizing employment, which would have required businesses to keep workers employed. On the same day, the government unveiled further emergency measures including a moratorium on evictions, a stay on all debt, seizure (except for alimony and child support), and bankruptcy proceedings until 31 December 2020.

April 2020: Restrictions continue 

On 2 April, Istanbul Medical Chamber expressed concern about Ministry of Health's tally, which included only the cases confirmed by reverse-transcription polymerase chain reaction tests, thereby excluding the ELISAs administered in private hospitals. Criticizing private hospitals' use of new antigen-testing technology that offer a much lower sensitivity, the Chamber of Physicians expressed concern over the decentralization of data collection.

On 3 April, citing the potential for asymptomatic transmission of SARS-CoV-2 by children, the Ministry of Health extended the curfew, which initially applied only to those 65 and older, to people twenty and younger. In a televised address on the same day, President Erdoğan announced the measures that prohibit entries into and exit from Turkey's largest cities, including the commercial hub Istanbul for 15 days.

On 6 April, the government announced building two new hospitals at the airport that can accommodate 2,000 patients. These hospitals will specialize in common life-support techniques, such as Extracorporeal membrane oxygenation (ECMO), for people with severe cases of COVID-19. On the same day, to promote face-mask use, the government started sending masks to everyone by mail.

On 10 April, the Ministry of Internal Affairs announced curfew with just two-hours notice. This resulted in a foreseeable pandemonium, with residents lining up by bakeries, shops, and markets to stock up on essentials. Following widespread criticism, Minister of Internal Affairs Soylu was forced to apologize and offer his resignation, which was rejected by the president.

On 13 April, President Erdoğan announced that curfews on weekends would continue but the restrictions were less stringent during the week, and many non-essential businesses, including construction sites remained open.

On 23 April, Turkey became the seventh country to report more than 100,000 coronavirus cases.

May 2020: Easing on restrictions 

On 4 May, Coronavirus Scientific Advisory Board stated that public-health interventions—lockdowns and mask use—have led to major drops in caseloads, reducing the strain on emergency rooms and intensive-care units. Explaining that the return to normal life will happen gradually, Ministry of Health stated that Turkey has an opportunity to create and upgrade to permanently pandemic-resistant cities by subsidizing businesses to make ventilation upgrades to limit spread of viruses, tackling poor indoor air quality, which has long been a source of disease.

State lawmakers' response to Ministry of Health's handling of the pandemic broke down along partisan lines. On 5 May, the opposition criticized the fact that businesses do not have clear triggers for when and how to shut down or reduce capacity in buildings.

On 7 May, the government acknowledged that the social-distancing measures, including the closure of offices and schools, ban on mass gatherings were rolled out without knowing which measures would work. Ministry of Health stated that by relaxing restrictions gradually, it will be able to make more informed recommendations on social-distancing measures in the future.

June 2020: Reopening 

On 1 June, domestic flights were resumed and most public spaces were opened, including restaurants, swimming pools, beaches, parks, libraries and museums.

On 2 June, the Turkish Parliament resumed full activities for the first time in 48 days since a hiatus was declared due to the pandemic. The Parliament started working under "new norms" including enhanced hygiene measures, use of masks and social distancing.

July 2020: Turkey opens for tourism 

In July, President Recep Tayyip Erdoğan urged a rewrite of Coronavirus Scientific Advisory Board guidelines to discourage reporting asymptomatic people who test positive for SARS-CoV-2. Over the objections of Coronavirus Scientific Advisory Board scientists, Ministry of Health started to publish incomplete coronavirus tally from 29 July.

August 2020: Turkey remains open for tourism 

Gross domestic product shrank 11 per cent in second quarter, the largest decline ever published by the Turkish Statistical Institute. The worst-affected sector was manufacturing, which contracted by 18%.

On 30 August, mayors of Istanbul and Ankara Ekrem İmamoğlu and Mansur Yavaş said that there was a mismatch between the statistics reported by Ministry of Health and the local data, and accused the national government of covering up the coronavirus resurgence.

September 2020: Further economic measures announced 

On 18 September, as part of statutory measures taken to counter the impact of the COVID-19 pandemic on the economy, a presidential decree extended the rule that limits corporations' dividends to 25% of their net profits in 2019. The rule, initially included in the Turkish Commercial Code as provisional article 13 was to phase out on 30 September.

October 2020: Reintroduction of restrictions 

In October, official figures showed that 9.3 million people visited the Turkey in the first eight months of this year, mainly from Russia, the United Kingdom, Ukraine, Germany and Bulgaria, with 2.2m arriving in August.

On 2 October, Minister of Internal Affairs, following an advisory opinion of Coronavirus Scientific Advisory Board, instructed all provinces to prohibit holding large public meetings until 1 December 2020.

November 2020: New lockdown 

On 20 November, Ministry of Health reinstated the curfew on people age 65 and older and people twenty and younger. On the same day, Minister of Internal Affairs ordered businesses and places of worship to halt indoor activities. Grocery stores and pharmacies have remained open, with legally imposed limits to capacity.

On 30 November, official figures showed that gross domestic product expanded 15.6 per cent compared with the previous quarter, and 6.7 per cent compared with a year earlier.

December 2020: Rising death roll and assessment of coronavirus vaccines 

On 6 December, Ministry of Health Fahrettin Koca announced that 50 million doses of CoronaVac should arrive by the end of February 2021, and 10 million doses of the Pfizer–BioNTech COVID-19 vaccine should start arriving still during December.

On 7 December, Pfizer and BioNTech finalized their submission to the Turkish Medicines and Medical Devices Agency (TMA), which has been reviewing data from the clinical trial on a rolling basis since October. The TMA said it would recommend granting an emergency use authorization if it concluded "that the benefits of the vaccine outweigh its risks in protecting against COVID-19", based on the 2004 law that created the TMA's process.

On 10 December, the seven-day averages for three of the primary metrics (tests, cases, hospitalizations) were at record highs. Earlier in the spring of 2020, during the first COVID-19 surge in the Turkey, the rising death toll reached a peak on 22 April, with a seven-day average of 122 daily deaths. In December, the seven-day average of deaths in Turkey from COVID-19 broke that record, at 255 on 29 December.

On 13 December, TMA pushed back formal assessments of two COVID-19 vaccines, delaying distribution of the Pfizer–BioNTech COVID-19 vaccine and CoronaVac in Turkey to the end of December. The TMA said it planned to give an opinion on the Pfizer–BioNTech COVID-19 vaccine at a meeting on 29 December. TMA has also delayed assessing the rival Moderna vaccine until 12 January.

January 2021: Vaccination and the UK variant 

Turkey detected 15 cases of the UK coronavirus variant on 1 January 2021. On 14 January 2021, Turkish President Recep Tayyip Erdoğan received the COVID-19 vaccine.

March 2021 
At the beginning of March, the Turkish government eased the restrictions, but the rates of infections rose to 21030. Turkey has witnessed a very bad season of tourism due to the restrictions of the pandemic but bars and restaurants were allowed to reopen at half-capacity in provinces with lower infection rates.

On 30 March, Turkey said that it will reimpose lockdowns during weekends and restrictions during Ramadan, and that is after confirming 37,303 new cases.

April 2021 
With the country's infection rate among the highest in Europe, on 29 April 2021, Turkey entered its first nationwide lockdown.

February 2022 
On February 5, 2022, Turkish President Recep Tayyip Erdogan and his wife, Emine, have tested positive for COVID-19. Erdogan announced that they had been infected with the Omicron coronavirus and were experiencing mild symptoms.

Government response

Child welfare and education

On 12 March 2020, the Ministry of National Education announced that with the exception of schools catering to students with special needs, all schools in Turkey would close starting on 16 March 2020. Given the intense learning needs of students with disabilities, the Ministry of National Education announced that elementary-, middle- and high-school students with special needs will continue to have in-person attendance in fixed small groups, with adults rotating into the class, so as to facilitate contact tracing. The Ministry of National Education subsequently announced that teachers and staff in schools for students with special needs are able to opt out of in-person teaching if they or their families have a health risk.

On 17 March, Minister Selçuk stated that a subset of teachers are focusing on content generation for the national online platform on TRT EBA TV, which became functional on 23 March 2020, with the rest of the teachers matched to students to provide individual assessment, coaching, and tutoring from 23 March to the end of the semester.

After the Ministry of National Education announced the closure of all schools (except those catering to students with special needs) on 12 March 2020, the government acknowledged the impact of the closure of schools on the welfare of children. Noting that children with preexisting mental-health issues or who live in non-supportive home environments are likely to suffer from being out of school, the government announced emergency measures, including fund increases for foster children, expansion of the nutrition assistance program, direct payments to families, and a national moratorium on evictions. To alleviate the social isolation of students, Minister Selçuk piloted a project on 27 March, where the Ministry of National Education started paying schools to offer small group activities for students on Mondays and Fridays, with deep cleaning sessions in between.

Economy 

Throughout the pandemic, despite additional headwinds such as Saudi bans on Turkish goods, Turkish economy has performed far better than that of many of the country's peers. The International Monetary Fund expects the Turkish economy to contract by 3.6 percent in 2020, versus 5.3 percent in Malaysia, 9 percent in Mexico, 9 percent in Greece, and 11.3 percent in Argentina.

Turkey provided a boost to the economy in a series of historically large economic packages. In the ₺141 billion economic measures package, the Parliament provided ₺500 billion ($63 billion) in forgivable loans to small businesses in part by raising the Credit Guarantee Fund (KGF) limit; sent ₺1,500 checks to retired Turks; and disbursed ₺2 billion as unemployment checks.

Unemployment peaked at 12.7% in 2020, and decreased to 11.9% following the economic expansion in the third quarter and job retention programs announced by the government. However, youth unemployment increased to 24.3%, meaning that the demographic least capable of bearing financial pain bore the majority of it.

International aid 

During the pandemic, Turkey has provided funds, doctors, dispatched medical equipment such as PPE, reverse-transcription polymerase chain reaction testing kits, and other assistance to at least 55 countries.

The dispatched medical equipment includes 1,300,000 N-95 masks and 300,000 reverse-transcription polymerase chain reaction testing kits in April alone.

By setting itself up as a provider rather than a recipient of aid, Turkey portrayed itself as a valuable partner in combating the global spread of SARS-CoV-2.

Vaccination

Statistics

Data table

Graphs

Cumulative cases, recoveries, and deaths

Daily confirmed cases

Daily confirmed COVID-19 deaths

Daily tests

Test positivity rate 

High positive test positivity rates may help identify severe underreporting of cases. The World Health Organization has suggested that an adequate test positivity rate should be between 3 and 12%.

Case fatality rate

Number of tests per case 

Number of tests per case is the inverse of the test positivity rate. WHO recommends in the range of 10–35 tests per case.

See also
 Timeline of the COVID-19 pandemic in Turkey
 Coronavirus Scientific Advisory Board (Turkey)
2018–2022 Turkish currency and debt crisis
 COVID-19 pandemic in Northern Cyprus
 COVID-19 pandemic in Europe
 COVID-19 pandemic by country and territory

Notes

References

External links

 Data and maps, frequently updated:
 
 Government-issued information:
 COVID-19  on the Turkish Ministry of Health website
 COVID-19 cases  on the Turkish Ministry of Health website
 COVID-19 Turkey Web Portal  on TÜBİTAK
 COVID-19 World Map  on the Digital Conversion Office of the President of Republic of Turkey

 
Turkey
Turkey
Turkey
2020s in Turkey